Ken "The Champ" Climo (born March 27, 1968, in Clearwater, Florida) is a professional disc golfer considered by many to be the best professional disc golfer of all time. Climo has claimed Twelve PDGA World Championship titles, including nine in as many years from 1990 to 1998.. Harold Duvall (1982, 1985), Barry Schultz (2003–2004), Nate Doss (2005, 2007, 2011), Paul McBeth (2012–2015, 2019, 2022) and Richard Wysocki (2016, 2017) are the only other golfers with more than one open world title.  In addition to his world titles, Climo has an unequalled record in the United States Disc Golf Championship (the premier event in the game), holding five titles (1999, 2000, 2002, 2004, 2007).  Named seven times as the PDGA player of the year, Ken Climo was inducted into the PDGA Hall of Fame in 1995.

He competed in the World Championships masters division for the first time in 2012, at the age of 44, and won by a large margin, for his 13th world championship title.  He has added 2 more world titles to his resume since then (2014, 2015).

In his 20 years on the PDGA, Climo has notched 103 aces.

Climo, with Innova Discs has created his own special blend of plastic, known as KC Pro. Several discs are for sale in KC Pro, including the Aviar and Roc.

Professional career

Open division

Climo has 221 wins in the Open Division, the most all-time, including 12 World Championships and 5 US Championships. He was the first player to ever win the World and US Championships in the same year.

PDGA Pro World Championships (12)

Other majors (8)

Major playoff record (0-1)

National tour (14)

NT playoff record (3-0)

Summary

Annual statistics

Masters division

Although eligible for the Masters Division in 2008 when he turned 40, Climo played his first Masters event in 2012, when he won the World Championships. He has won two additional World Championships since then (2014, 2015), bringing his total (including Open Division) to 15.

PDGA World Championships(3)

National tour (6)

NT playoff record (1-0)

Summary

Annual statistics

Equipment

Climo has been sponsored by Innova Champion discs throughout his career. He has a number of past and current signature discs (marked with *) and carries a combination of the following discs in competition:

Drivers
Boss (Champion)
Destroyer (Pro, Star)
Firebird (Champion)*
Katana (Echo Star)
Starfire (Pro)
Tern (Champion)*
Wraith (Pro, Star)*
XCaliber (Echo Star)

Fairway Drivers
Banshee (Champion)
Eagle (Champion)*
TeeBird (Champion, KC Pro)*
TL (Champion)
Sidewinder (Champion)

Midranges
Roc (KC Pro)*

Putters
Aviar (KC Pro)*

Climo's other signature discs have included: Cheetah, Cobra, Gazelle, Pegasus, Polaris LS, Raven, Scorpion, Stingray, Viper, Vulcan, Whippet, XD

External links
 Ken Climo's PDGA Profile

References

American disc golfers
Living people
1968 births
Place of birth missing (living people)
Sportspeople from Clearwater, Florida